ASF may refer to:

Arts and entertainment 
 Alabama Shakespeare Festival, a drama festival
 Asimov's Science Fiction, a U.S.-based English-language science fiction magazine containing SF stories

Science and technology

Biological 
 African swine fever virus (ASFV), the causative agent of African swine fever (ASF)
 Altered Schaedler flora, a standardized consortium of gastrointestinal microbial species
 Serine/arginine-rich splicing factor 1, a protein also known as alternative splicing factor 1 (ASF)

Computing 
 Advanced Synchronization Facility, a proposed extension to the x86 instruction set architecture
 Advanced Systems Format (formerly "Advanced Streaming Format", .asf), a Microsoft streaming format
 Alert Standard Format, a protocol for remote management and control of systems in OS-absent environments
 Anti Spam Filtering, software and hardware protection layers used to fight email spam
 Apache Software Foundation, an umbrella non-profit organization that owns the Apache brandname
 APL (programming language) data files (file extension .asf)
 Atmel Software Framework, a set of source files, libraries and reference projects that aid in application development for Atmel microcontrollers

Other uses 
 Acrylic silicone fluoropolymer, a car wax chemical
 Air superiority fighter
 Alaska Satellite Facility, a NASA data center
 Amperes per square foot, a unit of current density often used in electroplating

Organizations 
 Acid Survivors Foundation, in Bangladesh
 Airports Security Force, an aviation security division in Pakistan
 African Standby Force, an international peace force controlled by the African Union
 The American-Scandinavian Foundation, a non-profit organization
 American Steel Foundries
 Army Service Forces, a 1940s-era US military command, distinct from the Army Air Forces or Army Ground Forces.
 ASF Mexico (American School Foundation, A.C.)
 Asian Sailing Federation
 Australian Softball Federation
 Australian Speleological Federation, a caving body in Australia
 Avocats Sans Frontières, an international non-governmental organization
 Superior Auditor of the Federation
 Swiss Football Association ( and )

Other uses 
 Animal source foods, food items that come from an animal source
 alt.seduction.fast, a Usenet group
 Ashfield railway station, Glasgow, Scotland, National Rail designation
 Narimanovo Airport, Astrakhan, Russia, IATA code

See also